Paicu may refer to:

Paicu, a village in Nicolae Bălcescu Commune, Călărași County, Romania
Paicu, a village in Zîrnești Commune, Cahul district, Moldova